Jacques Rouffio (14 August 1928 – 8 July 2016) was a French film director and screenwriter. His 1986 film My Brother-in-law Killed My Sister was entered into the 36th Berlin International Film Festival.

Filmography as director
  (Horizon) (1967)
 Sept morts sur ordonnance (Seven Deaths by Prescription a.k.a. Bestial Quartet) (1975)
  (1977)
 Le sucre (Sugar) (1978)
 La Passante du Sans-Souci (The Passerby) (1982)
 Mon beau-frère a tué ma soeur (My Brother-in-Law Killed My Sister) (1986)
 State of Grace (1986)
  (1988) (TV)
  (The Red Orchestra) (1989)
 Le Stagiaire (1991) (TV)
  (The Life of Charles Pathé) (1995) (TV)

References

External links 

1938 births
2016 deaths
Actresses from Bordeaux
French film directors
French male screenwriters
French screenwriters